The Minnesota Executive Council is the council of state of the U.S. state of Minnesota. The Executive Council is currently constituted under Chapter 9 of Minnesota Statutes and has been in continuous existence since 1925.

Composition
The Executive Council is composed of Minnesota's five constitutional officers: the governor, the lieutenant governor, the secretary of state, the state auditor, and the attorney general. The governor, lieutenant governor, and the commissioner of the Department of Administration are ex officio chairperson, vice chairperson, and nonvoting executive secretary of the council, respectively. The Executive Council meets upon the call of the governor or upon the call of the executive secretary at the written request of three or more members.

Powers and duties
As the successor to the Board of Timber Commissioners, the State Board of Deposit, the State Board of Relief, and the State Land Commissioner, the Executive Council is generally charged with matters of state finance, emergency management, and administration of the state's natural resources.

State finance
The Executive Council designates banks, trust companies and credit unions as depositories for the safekeeping of state funds. In addition, the council advises the management and budget commissioner on the issuance of state debt and settles claims and controversies between the state of Minnesota and the United States government.

Emergency management
The Executive Council has the statutory authority to declare, extend, amend, or revoke states of emergency on the proposal of the governor. The council may also grant property tax relief to local governments in the aftermath of natural disasters. The council is otherwise directed to take all measures necessary to prevent emergencies and natural disasters from occurring, including relocating the legislative session in the event of imminent attack.

Natural resources
The Executive Council authorizes timber harvests on the public domain, rents state property, and sells state land. Moreover, the council selects in lieu lands from the federal government for the endowed support of public education via the Permanent School Fund and grants permits to individuals for the purposes of mineral prospecting and the drainage of certain navigable waters. However, perhaps the council's most apparent function to the public is to examine and approve leases of state lands. The council's leasing authority extends to no only upland leases for dams and submerged leases for ports and harbors, but also to mineral leases of sand, gravel, clay, rock, marl, peat, black dirt, iron ore, taconite, and all other mineral deposits underlying public lands owned by the state.

References

Government of Minnesota
Executive branches of government